Geraldine Fae (née Sparks) Evans (September 6, 1940 – March 30, 2018) was an American politician and teacher.

Born in Blue Earth, Minnesota, Evans received her bachelor's degree from Gustavus Adolphus College, and her master's and doctorate degrees from University of Minnesota. Evans taught school in New Brighton, Minnesota. She served on the St. Anthony-New Brighton School Board from 1988 to 1992 and was the chair of the school board. Evans was a Democrat. Evans served in the Minnesota House of Representatives from 1993 to 1995, from 1997 to 1999, and from 2001 to 2003. Evans died on March 30, 2018 in New Brighton, Minnesota.

Notes

External links

1940 births
2018 deaths
People from Blue Earth, Minnesota
People from New Brighton, Minnesota
Gustavus Adolphus College alumni
University of Minnesota alumni
Educators from Minnesota
American women educators
School board members in Minnesota
Women state legislators in Minnesota
Democratic Party members of the Minnesota House of Representatives